Ney González Sánchez (born January 25, 1963) is a Mexican politician and the former Governor of Nayarit (2005–September 18, 2011).  González Sánchez studied law in the Universidad Autónoma de Nayarit (UAN)  He is married to Maria del Rosario Mejía González, and has three children, Charo, Estefania and Ney. In 2005, Ney González was elected Governor of the State of Nayarit. He took office in September 2005.

References

Living people
1963 births
Institutional Revolutionary Party politicians
Governors of Nayarit
Members of the Chamber of Deputies (Mexico)
Members of the Congress of Nayarit
20th-century Mexican politicians
21st-century Mexican politicians
Politicians from Guadalajara, Jalisco
Autonomous University of Nayarit alumni
Municipal presidents of Tepic